Chum Saeng is a district (amphoe) in Nakhon Sawan province, upper central Thailand.

History
Chum Saeng is an old district of Nakhon Sawan. The government separated some parts of Mueang Nakhon Sawan district to establish Tambon Koei Chai. In 1903, the Interior ministry upgraded the tambon to be Phan Lan District, named after the central tambon. A few years later, the name was changed back to Koei Chai. The district office was moved to the west bank of the Nan River and renamed to Chum Saeng in 1915.

The name Chum Saeng in Thai is the name of a herb tree that look like Chaeng trees (ต้นแจง) (Maerua siamensis (Kurz) Pax.). Another possible origin of the name may date back the reign of King Taksin, when in the area was a weapons warehouse, named Khlang Saeng (คลังแสง) in Thai. 

Chum Saeng's ethnic group are Tai Dam people. At present, they live in Ban Phai Sing, Phai Sing Sub-district.

Chum Saeng during the reign of King Rama V was considered a community of Thai-Chinese and was the center of rice trade by water. Because it is the confluence of the two rivers Nan and Yom, and there is a  northern railway line runs passes through. Chum Saeng has been a very active place in around 1960s–70s.  Moreover in those days, it was still filled with gold shops and people prefer to use train as the main vehicle for travel, but after more road cuts as a result, water and train travel is reduced, thus making this district less important by time.

Geography
Neighboring districts are (from the north clockwise): Pho Thale and Bang Mun Nak of Phichit province, Nong Bua, Tha Tako, Mueang Nakhon Sawan and Kao Liao of Nakhon Sawan Province.

Chum Saeng is about 39 km (24 mi) from Mueang Nakhon Sawan.

Administration
The district is divided into 12 sub-districts (tambons), which are further subdivided into 131 villages (mubans). Chum Saeng is a town (thesaban mueang) covering tambon Chum Saeng. Thap Krit is a township (thesaban tambon) covering parts of the same-named tambon. There are a further 11 tambon administrative organizations (TAO).

Economy
Asian palmyra palm (Borassus flabellifer L.) is an important industrial crop of the district. Approximately 24,000 palm trees are planted throughout the area, some of which are hundreds of years old.

Transportation
The district is served by the three railway stations, Thap Krit, Khlong Pla Kot, and Chum Saeng of the State Railway of Thailand (SRT).

There is also a minibus service from Mo Chit 2 Station in Bangkok to Chum Saeng. The minibus terminal is behind the Chum Saeng railway station near Chum Saeng Old Market.

Tourism
At present, Chum Saeng is still able to maintain the status of the old city like the past. Therefore suitable for cultural tourism there are many interesting places like Chum Saeng Old Market, which is over 100 years old, Chum Saeng Railway Station, the classical railway station and the last stop of Nakhon Sawan before entering Phichit, Wat Koei Chai Neua temple, King Taksin Statue rim Nan River, Hiran Narumit Bridge, Chao Pho-Chao Mae Chum Saeng Shrine etc. 

Chum Saeng also was the backdrop for 2019's popular TV drama, Channel 3's Krong Kam, resulting in the district becoming better known and a tourist attraction for the drama's fans and general public.

References

External links
amphoe.com (Thai)

Chum Saeng